Mary Kay Vyskocil (born March 22, 1958) is a United States district judge of the United States District Court for the Southern District of New York and a former United States Bankruptcy Judge for the same court. President Donald Trump nominated her to the district bench in 2018 and again in 2019, and she was confirmed in 2019.

Education 

Vyskocil earned her undergraduate degree from the Dominican College in Rockland County, New York, where she was the class valedictorian and student government president, and her Juris Doctor from St. John's University School of Law, where she served on the Moot Court Executive Board.

Legal career 

Prior to her appointment to the bench, she practiced general commercial litigation for almost thirty-three years at the New York City-based law firm of Simpson Thacher & Bartlett.

Federal judicial service

Bankruptcy court service 

Vyskocil was selected to become a Judge of the United States Bankruptcy Court for the Southern District of New York in 2016. She was sworn in as a United States bankruptcy judge on April 7, 2016, and served until her elevation as a district court judge.

District court service 

In August 2017, Vyskocil was one of several candidates pitched to New York senators Chuck Schumer and Kirsten Gillibrand by the White House as judicial candidates for vacancies on the federal courts in New York. On May 10, 2018, President Donald Trump announced his intent to nominate Vyskocil to serve as a United States district judge for the United States District Court for the Southern District of New York. On May 15, 2018, her nomination was sent to the Senate. She was nominated to the seat that was vacated by Judge Loretta A. Preska, who assumed senior status on March 1, 2017. On August 1, 2018, a hearing on her nomination was held before the Senate Judiciary Committee. On September 13, 2018, her nomination was reported out of committee by a 21–0 vote.

On January 3, 2019, her nomination was returned to the President under Rule XXXI, Paragraph 6 of the United States Senate. On April 8, 2019, President Trump announced the renomination of Vyskocil to the district court. On May 21, 2019, her nomination was sent to the Senate. On June 20, 2019, her nomination was reported out of committee by a 21–1 vote. On December 18, 2019, the United States Senate invoked cloture on her nomination by a 89–4 vote. On December 19, 2019, her nomination was confirmed by a 91–3 vote. She received her judicial commission on December 20, 2019.

On December 5, 2019, Karen McDougal, an American model and one-time Playboy magazine Playmate who has an affair with Trump in 2006 to 2007, filed a defamation lawsuit against the television network Fox News. According to the suit, network anchor Tucker Carlson defamed McDougal by saying that she had personally extorted Trump for the hush money she received in 2016, a claim she denied. On September 24, 2020,  Vyskocil dismissed the defamation lawsuit, writing that, "The statements are rhetorical hyperbole and opinion commentary intended to frame a political debate, and, as such, are not actionable as defamation".  The judge added that the "'general tenor' of the show should then inform a viewer that [Carlson] is not 'stating actual facts' about the topics he discusses and is instead engaging in 'exaggeration' and 'non-literal commentary.'"

Memberships 

She was a member of the Federalist Society from 1998 to 2005.

Awards and recognition 

Vyskocil has been ranked as one of the "Top Ten Women Litigators in the United States" by Benchmark Litigation. In 2016, she received a "Top Women in Law Award" from the New York Law Journal. She has been recognized as a litigation leader by Chambers, Legal 500, Who's Who Legal and America's Leading Business Lawyers, and Law360.

References

External links 
 
 

1958 births
Living people
20th-century American women lawyers
20th-century American lawyers
21st-century American women lawyers
21st-century American lawyers
21st-century American judges
21st-century American women judges
Dominican College (New York) alumni
Federalist Society members
Judges of the United States bankruptcy courts
Judges of the United States District Court for the Southern District of New York
Lawyers from New York City
New York (state) lawyers
Simpson Thacher & Bartlett associates
Simpson Thacher & Bartlett partners
St. John's University School of Law alumni
United States district court judges appointed by Donald Trump